Karoline Otte (born 11 September 1996) is a German politician of Alliance 90/The Greens who has been serving as a member of the Bundestag since the 2021 German federal election.

Political career
In parliament, Otte has been serving on the Committee on Tourism and the Committee on Housing, Urban Development, Building and Local Government.

Other activities
 German United Services Trade Union (ver.di), Member

References

External links 
 

Living people
1996 births
Politicians from Göttingen
21st-century German politicians
21st-century German women politicians
Members of the Bundestag for Alliance 90/The Greens
Members of the Bundestag 2021–2025
Female members of the Bundestag